Vota Juan is a Spanish comedy television series created  and . Produced by 100 Balas (Mediapro), the first season of the series consists of eight thirty-minute episodes that began airing on TNT España on 25 January 2019. The series was renewed for a second season, which was released as a sequel series with the new title Vamos Juan on 29 March 2020.

Premise
Set in the world of Spanish politics, Vota Juan revolves around the character of Juan Carrasco (Javier Cámara), an uninspiring Minister of Agriculture who, after finding his political ambitions awoken by a series of chance political events, decides to take part in his party's primary elections thereby giving himself a chance to eventually run for the position of President of the Government. Party intrigues, jealousy, crises... as he undertakes this none too easy task he will count on the invaluable help of his press chief, his secretary and his personal advisor. His campaign team, much like him, try to make up for their lack of experience and political expertise through a mixture of guile and a whole host of other shenanigans. Will Juan Carrasco manage to make it all the way to the top?

Cast

Episodes

Season 1 (2019)

References

External links
 
 

2010s comedy television series
2019 Spanish television series debuts
Political satirical television series
Spanish satirical television shows
Spanish-language television shows
Television shows set in Spain
2010s political television series
2019 Spanish television series endings
2010s Spanish comedy television series
Spanish political satire
TNT (Spanish TV channel) original programming